Aberforth Smaller Companies Trust is a large British investment trust dedicated to investments in smaller companies. Established 10 December 1990, the company is a constituent of the FTSE 250 Index, an index of the larger companies on the London Stock Exchange. 

The chairman is Richard Davidson. The company is managed by a team from Aberforth Unit Trust Managers who specialise in smaller companies funds.

References

External links
  Official site

Financial services companies established in 1990
Investment trusts of the United Kingdom
Companies listed on the London Stock Exchange